The Russia Tower (Bashnya Rossiya) was a skyscraper project planned for the Moscow International Business Center in Moscow, Russia. It was started but eventually was cancelled due to the financial crisis of 2007–2008 and replaced by Neva Towers project.

Development
The original idea for the building was proposed in 1994. Since then, the tower's planned location has changed five times.

In 2006, at the Pushkin Museum in Moscow, proposed designs of the Russia Tower were presented. The model by Norman Foster won. This 2006 version had a height of 612 m and 118 floors. Construction began in September 2007, with a planned completion date of 2012, which was later postponed to 2016.

The total area of the structure would have covered , of which approximately  would have been underground. The tower would have contained 118 floors, 101 elevators, and 3,680 underground parking spaces. Commercial retail shops would have been located at the base of the building. The maximum capacity of the building was projected to be around 30,000 people.

The tower's development company froze the project and halted construction in November 2008, suspended it in February 2009, and in June 2009, the project was officially cancelled. The financial crisis of 2007–2008 led to problems in financing the project.

Financial and business history 
It was designed by the Chicago-based architecture firm Skidmore, Owings and Merrill.

Its building site was soon moved to plot 14. In the middle of 2003 an updated, 134-story design had been approved and the site moved to plots 17 and 18. In January 2004, the Moscow Development Company (STT Group) was appointed as the main investor and developer of the US$2-billion project.

On 18 September 2007, the building's cornerstone was laid in a groundbreaking ceremony.

Russian news agency Interfax reported on 21 November 2008 that construction on the tower was to be halted. Shalva Chigirinsky, head of the tower's development company, indicated that the financial crisis of 2007–2008 had left him unable to secure financing for the project and had also removed demand for the tower's office space, even if the building were able to be completed.

On 3 December 2008, Russian oil company Sibir Energy agreed to buy a number of real estate assets, including Russia Tower, from Chigirinsky. As Chigirinsky was a major shareholder in Sibir Energy, the purpose of the purchase was to alleviate financial pressures upon him, so that he would not be forced to sell his company shares, which in turn enable the company to preserve its existing shareholder structure.

However, many business news analysts decried the move, arguing that such use of the oil company's business capital to assist Chigirinsky by purchasing his economically distressed real estate assets—which had no relation to the company's core oil business—at possibly inflated prices was detrimental to the company's shareholders and constituted a significant conflict of interest.

On 12 February 2009, it was announced that the Russia Tower will most likely not be built. The project developer's assistant stated that, "In today's economy, a project of such scale is no longer feasible for us and can no longer be justified." In place of the tower, the company proposed to use the land to build three smaller skyscrapers and a large parking garage.

In June 2009, the project was officially cancelled, to be turned into a parking lot for existing buildings.  However, a smaller building is planned to be built on the site eventually.

References

External links 
 Fosters and Partners official site 
 Halvorson and Partners Structural Engineers official site 
 Waterman Group official site 
 Wordsearch official site - branding and marketing partner 
 Additional Images at e-architect.co.uk 
 Facts on SkyscraperPage.com 
 Facts and pictures in Emporis 

Skyscrapers in Moscow
Moscow International Business Center
Unbuilt buildings and structures in Russia
Unbuilt skyscrapers